Rabel may refer to:

People
 Abraham Rabel or Abraham Aberle (1811–1841), Moravian Hebrew poet, translator and writer
 André-Marie Rabel (1878–1934), French fencer
 Daniel Rabel (1578–1637), French painter, engraver, miniaturist, botanist and natural history illustrator
 Ernst Rabel (1874–1955), Austrian-born American scholar of law
 Fanny Rabel (1922–2008), born Fanny Rabinovich, Polish-born Mexican artist
 Gabriele Rabel (1880–1963), Austrian physicist and botanist
 Laszlo Rabel (1937–1968), American soldier

Places
 Rabel, Schleswig-Holstein, Germany

Other
 Rabel (instrument)
 Rabel Journal of Comparative and International Private Law